On 30 December 2020, Islamic State of Iraq and the Levant (ISIL) forces ambushed a Syrian government troop convoy killing between 28 and 39 people and injuring at least 15.

Background
After the 2017 ISIL defeat in the area, ISIL changed to insurgency tactics. Cells and raiding parties placed improvised explosive devices (IED) at towns and checkpoints, and ambushed convoys.

Ambush
The 2020 Deir ez-Zor ambush was an ISIL ambush on the Homs-Deir ez-Zor road. The ambush targeted three busses carrying 4th Division soldiers on their way back home to celebrate the new Year. The ambush started when ISIL set up a fake checkpoint in order to stop the convoy. ISIL attacked the convoy using multiple IEDs and heavy weapons, destroying one of the three buses, leaving 39 dead including eight officers of the Syrian military and at least 15 injured. Two busses managed to escape the ambush and make it back safely.

See also
2020 Afrin bombing
Al-Otaiba ambush
Akashat ambush
History of the Syrian Civil War (2020–present)
List of terrorist incidents in Syria

References 

2020 in the Syrian civil war
ISIL terrorist incidents in Syria